Archie Savage (April 19, 1914 — February 14, 2003) was an American dancer, choreographer, and film and theatre actor. He was a pioneer of the African-American modern dance. For several years he was a partner of Katherine Dunham in her dance company. He was among the teachers of Dunham Technique at her school.

Archie was one of the earliest black men to portray an astronaut in film. Another one, in the same year of 1960, was Julius Ongewe in the German/Polish  film First Spaceship on Venus.

The Archie Savage Dancers appear in the movie, “The Glenn Miller Story” and are acknowledged in the film's credits.  In one scene, they appear on a screen in a recording studio as the band is recording the song “Tuxedo Junction,” to which they are performing.

Filmography
 1941: Carnival of Rhythm (starring with Katherine Dunham), American short 
 1944: Jammin' the Blues (dancer), American short about jazz, part of the Melody Master series
 1954: Vera Cruz (a cutthroat gunslinger), American film
 1960: Space-Men (space station pilot Al ), Italian science fiction film
 1969: Bootleggers (Jeremiah), Italian-Spanish crime-action film
 1954: His Majesty O'Keefe (Boogulroo), American adventure film
 1967: Death Rides a Horse (Vigro), Italian Spaghetti Western
 1970: Notes Towards an African Orestes (singer), Italian film

References

External links

1914 births
2003 deaths
African-American male dancers
African-American male actors
20th-century American male actors
20th-century African-American people
21st-century African-American people
Federal Theatre Project people